This is a list of diplomatic missions of the Federative Republic of Brazil, excluding Honorary Consulates.

The Ministry of Foreign Affairs of Brazil was established by Emperor Peter I in 1823, shortly after the independence of Brazil.

Brazil maintains diplomatic relations with all 193 member states of the United Nations, in addition to United Nations General Assembly observers Holy See, Palestine and Order of Malta, as well as the Cook Islands and Niue, and unofficial relations with Taiwan. The country has a large global network of resident diplomatic missions in 133 countries and several missions to multilateral organizations.

In Brazil, Itamaraty is generally used as a metonymy for the Ministry of Foreign Affairs. The name stems from that of the palaces in Rio de Janeiro and Brasília, former and present headquarters of the Ministry.

Current missions

Africa

Americas

Asia

Europe

Oceania

Multilateral organizations

Gallery

Closed missions

Africa

Americas

Asia

Europe

Mission to open

See also

 Foreign relations of Brazil
 List of diplomatic missions in Brazil
 Ministry of Foreign Affairs of Brazil
 Visa policy of Brazil

Notes

External links

Ministry of External Relations of Brazil

References

 
Brazil
Diplomatic missions